The Japan–United States Friendship Act of 1975 seek to establish a cooperative peacetime friendship through the exchange of artistic and cultural endowments. The United States statute is a declaration stating a Japan–United States friendship will provide a global model partnership leading to future peace, prosperity, and security in Asia. The Act of Congress acknowledges the 1971 Okinawa Reversion Agreement relinquishing United States authority of the Okinawa Prefecture better known as the Daitō Islands and Ryukyu Islands. The Act created the Japan–United States Friendship Trust Fund and Japan–United States Friendship Commission developing programs for the artistic and cultural exchanges between America and Japan.

The S. 824 legislation was passed by the 94th United States Congressional session and enacted into law by the 38th President of the United States Gerald Ford on October 20, 1975.

Content of the Act
The United States public law was compiled as six codified sections for the administrative functions of the Japan–United States Friendship Trust Fund.

22 U.S.C. 44 § 2901 – Statement of Findings and Purpose
22 U.S.C. 44 § 2902 – Establishment of the Japan–United States Friendship Trust Fund and Expenditures
22 U.S.C. 44 § 2903 – Establishment of the Japan–United States Friendship Commission
22 U.S.C. 44 § 2904 – Functions of the Japan–United States Friendship Commission
22 U.S.C. 44 § 2905 – Administrative Provisions
22 U.S.C. 44 § 2906 – Management of the Japan–United States Friendship Trust Fund

Emperor of Japan State Visit

The Emperor of Japan and Empress of Japan briefly visited the United States in September 1971 while en route to Europe. Emperor Shōwa and Empress Kōjun completed a stopover at Elmendorf Air Force Base in Anchorage, Alaska meeting the 37th President of the United States Richard Nixon and First Lady Pat Nixon on September 26, 1971.

Emperor Hirohito and Empress Nagako Kuni departed the Tokyo Imperial Palace in October 1975 for a fifteen-day goodwill tour of the United States. The Japanese royal family joined U.S. President Gerald Ford's Administration at the White House seeking to bolster a Pacific friendship while developing a better understanding of American culture and Japanese culture.

Emperor Hirohito state visit encompassed Colonial Williamsburg, Washington, D.C., New York City, Chicago, Los Angeles, and San Francisco. Emperor Shōwa pursued marine biology interests at the Woods Hole Oceanographic Institution at Cape Cod on October 4, 1975 and the Scripps Institution of Oceanography in San Diego on October 9, 1975. Emperor Hirohito and Empress Nagako Kuni concluded their State visit to the United States in Honolulu on October 13, 1975.

See also

 Japan–United States relations
 Japan–United States Security Treaty
 Japanese Cultural Center of Hawaii
 National Cherry Blossom Festival
 The Japanese Art Society of America

References

Reading Bibliography

Historical Video Archives

External links
 
 
 
 
 
 
 
 
 
 
 

94th United States Congress
1975 in the United States
Japanese-American history
1975 in international relations
United States foreign relations legislation